My Name Is Juani is a 2006 Spanish drama film directed by Bigas Luna. Verónica Echegui stars as the title character alongside Dani Martín and Laya Martí.

Plot
Juani comes from a very poor background, having grown up in a slummy neighborhood of Tarragona. She has problems at home and argues incessantly with her boyfriend, with whom she has been since she was 15. Soon his infidelity and overall uselessness, as well as the limitations of her poor and small town, become unbearable for Juani, a girl with big dreams and aspirations. She and her best friend leave for Madrid in search of a better life. At first the big city, a complete opposite of their hometown, couldn't seem to be a better place for their adolescent expectations of life. But their naïve dreams are soon shattered by the ruthlessness of their dream city. In a visit home Juani almost decides she will not return to Madrid, and will instead come back to old relationships and live again in her parents' house. She expresses these sentiments to her mother who tells her that she loves Juani's father, but always asks herself what her life would have been like had she left, like Juani. After speaking to her mother Juani realizes that she can not give up just because she has been having a hard time in Madrid. In a tearful finale, she decides to return to Madrid with less naïve expectations, hoping to escape the abusive relationship she has with her boyfriend and the future she would have were she to stay in her town. The moral of the story becomes clear: never forget what you set out to get, despite the struggles that come your way, and never give up on your dreams.

Cast

Production 
The screenplay was penned by Carmen Chaves Gastaldo and Bigas Luna. The film was produced by Media Films and Virgili Films, in association with TVE and TVC.

Release 
Distributed by Manga Films, the film was theatrically released in Spain on 20 October 2006.

Accolades

|-
| align = "center" rowspan = "3" | 2007 || 21st Goya Awards || Best New Actress || rowspan = "3" | Verónica Echegui ||  || 
|-
| 51st Sant Jordi Awards || Best Spanish Actress ||  || 
|-
| 16th Actors and Actresses Union Awards || Best New Actress ||  || 
|}

See also 
 List of Spanish films of 2006

References

Bibliography

External links
 

2006 films
2000s Spanish-language films
2006 drama films
Films set in Catalonia
Films set in Madrid
Films directed by Bigas Luna
Spanish drama films
2000s Spanish films